Montara may refer to:
Montara, California
Montara State Beach
Montara, Kansas
Montara Mountain
Montara oil spill
Montara (album), an album by Bobby Hutcherson